Tomislav Bašić may refer to:

Tomislav Bašić (footballer) (born 1980), Bosnian-Herzegovinian footballer
Tomislav Bašić (sailor) (born 1975), Croatian sailor